Everybody Looking is the ninth studio album by American rapper Gucci Mane. It was released on July 22, 2016, by GUWOP Enterprises, RBC Records and Atlantic Records. The album serves as Gucci's first studio release since The Return of Mr. Zone 6 (2011). It features guest appearances from Drake, Kanye West and Young Thug, while the majority of the album's production was provided by Gucci Mane's longtime collaborators such as Mike Will Made It and Zaytoven, among others.

Everybody Looking received generally positive reviews from critics and debuted at number two on the US Billboard 200, and becoming Gucci Mane's highest-charting album.

Background
In June 2016, the album was announced, following Gucci Mane's release from prison in May 2016. Recording sessions for the entire album took place in under six days.

Promotion
On July 12, 2016, Gucci Mane released the album's promotional single, "Multi Millionaire Laflare". The album's intro track, "No Sleep", was released on July 15, 2016, the music video for the song was released on July 18.

The album's lead single, "1st Day Out tha Feds", was released on May 27, 2016. The song was produced by Mike Will Made It. The album's second single, "Back on Road" with Drake, was released on June 4, 2016. The song was produced by Murda Beatz. The album's third single, "All My Children", was released on June 24, 2016. The song was produced by Drumma Boy.

Critical reception

Everybody Looking was met with generally positive reviews. At Metacritic, which assigns a normalized rating out of 100 to reviews from mainstream publications, the album received an average score of 72, based on 13 reviews. Aggregator AnyDecentMusic? gave it 6.6 out of 10, based on their assessment of the critical consensus.

Neil Z. Yeung of AllMusic gave a positive review, stating "Everybody Looking is one of the best examples of Gucci Mane's contributions to rap in his highly prolific catalog". Narsimha Chintaluri of HipHopDX said, "Mike WiLL Made-It and Zaytoven construct a cinematic backdrop, but Gucci's execution is a bit wanting. Regardless, it's a clear step in the right direction, a completely different beast than the b-side littered mixtapes he's sanctioned from behind bars over the past three years, and begs for repeat listens". Christina Lee of Rolling Stone said, "Everybody Looking, Gucci's ninth album and first after a two-year stay in federal prison, is a compelling left turn, the sound of a veteran innovator reclaiming his territory not with larger-than-life charisma and off-the-wall imagery but fresh intimidation tactics". Julian Benbow of The Boston Globe wrote: "There's less party and more perspective. He sees the troubles he went through before prison for what they are."

David Drake of Pitchfork stated, "It will please fans looking for Another Gucci Mane mixtape. Everyone else will likely find it a bit spotty. Certain songs fall into familiar—now six- or seven-year-old—formulas. His vocals, no doubt out of practice, sound a bit rusty. But most of all, it just feels unfinished, rushed". In a mixed review, The Guardians Lanre Bakare stated: "As usual, he's at his best when things get a little weird." Michael G. Barilleaux of RapReviews said, "While the beats are relatively mediocre and not at all unusual for this brand of hip hop, they do a decent job matching the dark picture Gucci paints. Unfortunately, that picture is more of a rough sketch as Gucci steers more toward unrefined flows and bland, mechanically arching vocals rather than a more thought out approach". In another mixed review, Damien Morris of The Observer said, "The eerie emotional electricity and forensic detail of the single "1st Day Out tha Feds" dissipates across 14 songs that desperately lack variety and humour, and choruses that aren't just Gucci grimly repeating the song's title".

Commercial performance
Everybody Looking debuted at number two on the US Billboard 200 with 68,000 album-equivalent units, 43,000 of which were pure album sales.

Track listing

Notes
  signifies a co-producer

Personnel
Credits adapted from the album's liner notes.

Performers
Gucci Mane – primary artist
Drake – featured artist
Kanye West – featured artist
Young Thug – featured artist

Production

Drumma Boy – producer
Mike Will Made It – producer
Murda Beatz – producer
Myles Harris – producer
Boi-1da – producer
Southside – producer
Will-A-Fool – producer
Zaytoven – producer
Pluss – co-producer 
Marz – co-producer
Swae Lee – co-producer

Technical

Kori Anders – mixing
Harley Arsenal – recording assistant
Chris Athens – mastering
Noel Cadastre – recording
Noel "Gadget" Campbell – mixing
Noah Goldstein – recording assistant
Aaron Holton – arranger
The Sauce – recording, mixing
Jaycen Joshua – mixing
Dave Kutch – mastering
Greg Moffet – recording assistant
40 – recording, mixing assistant
Sean Paine – recording
Peter "Zlender" Vickers – mixing assistant
Mike Will Made It – mixing

Additional personnel

Jonathan Mannion – photography
Shun Melson – styling direction
Virgilio Tzaj – art direction, design

Charts

Weekly charts

Year-end charts

Certifications

References

Gucci Mane albums
2016 albums
Albums produced by Mike Will Made It
Albums produced by Zaytoven
Albums produced by Drumma Boy
Albums produced by Murda Beatz
Albums produced by Southside (record producer)
Atlantic Records albums